Shurabeh-ye Malek (also Romanized as Shūrābeh-ye Malek and Shūrābeh Malek; also known as Sūrāvā) is a village in Nabovat Rural District, in the Central District of Eyvan County, Ilam Province, Iran. At the 2006 census, its population was 197, in 39 families. The village is populated by Kurds.

References 

Populated places in Eyvan County
Kurdish settlements in Ilam Province